Personal Flag (1983–2005) was an American Thoroughbred racehorse. Bred and raced by Ogden Phipps, he was sired by Private Account and out of the mare Grecian Banner, a daughter of Hoist The Flag He was a full brother to Personal Ensign.

Trained by Shug McGaughey, among his notable race wins, Personal Flag won the Grade 1 Widener Handicap in 1987  and the then Grade 1 Suburban Handicap in 1988.

Personal Flag was euthanized in 2005 due to the infirmities of old age.

References

1983 racehorse births
2005 racehorse deaths
Racehorses bred in Kentucky
Racehorses trained in the United States
Phipps family
Thoroughbred family 6-a